Alain Danilet (3 June 1947 in Noyon (Oise) - 8 February 2012 in Villevieille (Gard) was a French politician.

Biography
He was elected deputy of the fifth district of Gard in the colors of RPR for the Tenth Parliament (1993-1997). His deputy was Christian Burglé, Mayor CDS Euzet (1989-2001). 
He was close to the former deputy mayor of Beaucaire, Jean-Marie André. 
He represented the legislative elections of 1997, and failed the second round with 40.59% of the vote against Damien Alary.
 
He also worked as a civil servant, and National Police officer.
 
In 2004, he tried to defeat Christian Valette (PS) of Sommières Township.
 
He was elected mayor of Sommières in March 2001. 
In 2005, faced with the resignation of almost all of the city council, he lost his term as mayor and councilman. 
Guy Marotte succeeded him.
 
He joined the ranks of the UMP since its creation in 2002.

Mandates 
 Member of the fifth district of the Gard 1993-1997
 Sommières Mayor from 2001 to 2005

References

External links

1947 births
2012 deaths
People from Noyon
Politicians from Hauts-de-France
Rally for the Republic politicians
Union for a Popular Movement politicians
Deputies of the 10th National Assembly of the French Fifth Republic
Mayors of places in Occitania (administrative region)
French police officers